John Wooler (born 1958) is a producer, former record label executive, and co-founder of Exolution. With 25 years of worldwide music industry experience, he worked for almost 20 years as an executive at Virgin Records where he founded Point Blank Records.

He was responsible for signing and producing artists such as Van Morrison, Charlie Watts from the Rolling Stones, John Lee Hooker and John P. Hammond.

He is an owner of the artist representation and production company Exolution, and is a professor of music industry at Cal Poly Pomona.

References

1958 births
Living people
People educated at the High School of Dundee